Kakababur Protyaborton is an Indian Bengali-language adventure drama film directed by Srijit Mukherji and produced by Shrikant Mohta and Mahendra Soni. It is based on a Bengali adventure novel of Sunil Gangopadhyay, Jongoler Modhye Ek Hotel. This film is released under the banner of Shree Venkatesh Films. This is the third film of Srijit's Kakababu series after Mishawr Rawhoshyo and Yeti Obhijaan.

Plot
Raja Roy Chowdhury alias Kakababu and his nephew young Santu goes to Nairobi, Kenya for a relax trip. A Bengali man named Amal hosts them. In the meantime Kakababu receives threat call but he ignores as usual. A Kenya Government official and businessman Mr. Ninjane invites Kakababu to visit his hotel at Maasai Mara forest. After an adventurous journey Kakababu and Santu reach the hotel inside the jungle. In the meantime Kakababu comes to learn from other sources that a few days earlier two German tourists mysteriously disappeared from the hotel. He enquires on it and faces a serious trouble.

Cast
 Prosenjit Chatterjee as Kakababu 
 Aryann Bhowmik as Santu
 Anirban Chakrabarti as Amal De
 Srijit Mukherji as PR Lohia (special appearance)
 Soumyabrata Rakshit as Hasmukh Patel
 Jacques Adriaanse as Gunard Olen
 Alonso Grandio

Soundtrack

The background score and the soundtracks are composed by Indraadip Dasgupta and lyrics are penned by Srijato.

Release 
The film was released on 4 February 2022 coinciding with the occasion of Saraswati Puja.

Reception

See also
 Kakababu in other media

References

External links
 
 Jungler Moddhe Ek Hotel

Bengali-language Indian films
Indian children's films
Indian detective films
Films shot in Africa
Films based on Indian novels
Films directed by Srijit Mukherji
2022 films
Indian adventure films
2020s Bengali-language films
Films based on works by Sunil Gangopadhyay